Zainab may refer to:
 Zaynab (novel) or Zaynab: Country Scenes and Moral, considered the first modern Egyptian novel, published 1913
Zaynab (name)